Cristian Alejandro Torres Frausto (born February 12, 1996) is a Mexican professional footballer who currently plays for Correcaminos UAT. He played with Acaxees de Durango of the Liga de Balompié Mexicano during the league's inaugural season in 2020–21.

References

External links
 
 

1996 births
Living people
Mexican footballers
Association football defenders
Club León footballers
Correcaminos UAT footballers
Liga MX players
Ascenso MX players
Liga Premier de México players
Tercera División de México players
Footballers from Guanajuato
Sportspeople from León, Guanajuato
Liga de Balompié Mexicano players